Sidney Bollon (3 December 1899 – 26 October 1986) was an English first-class cricketer.

Shortly after the conclusion of the First World War, Bollon played first-class cricket for a Demobilised Officers cricket team against a combined Army and Navy cricket team at Lord's in 1919. He bowled 23.1 overs in the Army and Navy first-innings, taking figures of 5 for 59. In the Demobilised Officers first-innings, he was dismissed for 9 runs by Nigel Haig. He followed up his five wickets in the Army and Navy first-innings by taking the wicket of John Tasker.

In 1920 he began working for the railways, later holding the position of publicity officer for the British Transport Commission. He worked for the railways until 1962. He died at Tavistock in October 1986.

References

External links

1899 births
1986 deaths
People from Edmonton, London
English cricketers
Demobilised Officers cricketers